Captain Poison (Spanish: El capitán Veneno) is a 1951 Spanish historical comedy film directed by Luis Marquina and starring Sara Montiel, Fernando Fernán Gómez and Amparo Martí. It is an adaptation of a novel of the same title by Pedro Antonio de Alarcón which had previously been made into a 1943 Argentine film and a 1945 Mexican film. The story is set in Spain during the 1840s, in the reign of Isabella II.

Synopsis 
Set in 1848 during the reign of Isabel II, it tells the story of Captain Jorge de Córdoba, nicknamed "Captain Poison" for his extremely conflictive character that prevents him from being at peace with anyone. Hardened bachelor and always manifesting his aversion towards the female sex, Don Jorge suffers great humiliation when he is wounded in a street riot and is saved by the young Angustias, his mother and his servant. Due to the injuries sustained, "Captain Poison" has no choice but to spend his convalescence in that home with three women, which provokes continual outbursts of temper. However, little by little, things change when the severe soldier is impacted by the internal tragedy of the family and, of course, he will end up succumbing to the charms of the beautiful Angustias.

Main cast
 Sara Montiel as Angustias  
 Fernando Fernán Gómez as Jorge de Córdoba  
 Amparo Martí as Doña Teresa  
 José Isbert as Doctor Sánchez  
 Julia Caba Alba as Rosa  
 Manuel Arbó as Tabernero  
 Julia Lajos as Marquesa de Villadiego  
 Casimiro Hurtado as Mayordomo Esteban  
 Ena Sedeño as Condesa de Cañizo  
 Joaquín Roa as Secretario 1º  
 Manolo Morán as Marqués de Tomillares  
 Trini Montero as Julita

References

Bibliography 
 de España, Rafael. Directory of Spanish and Portuguese film-makers and films. Greenwood Press, 1994.

External links 
 

1950s historical comedy films
Spanish historical comedy films
1951 films
1950s Spanish-language films
Films based on works by Pedro Antonio de Alarcón
Films directed by Luis Marquina
Films set in the 1840s
Spanish black-and-white films
1950s Spanish films